Harna (also Romanized as Hārnā; also known as Qeshlāq-e Hārnā) is a village in Abish Ahmad Rural District, Abish Ahmad District, Kaleybar County, East Azerbaijan Province, Iran. At the 2006 census, its population was 166, in 29 families.

References 

Populated places in Kaleybar County